William Prout FRS (15 January 1785 – 9 April 1850) was an English chemist, physician, and natural theologian.  He is remembered today mainly for what is called Prout's hypothesis.

Biography
Prout was born in Horton, Gloucestershire in 1785 and educated at 17 years of age by a clergyman, followed by the Redland Academy at Bristol and Edinburgh University, where he graduated in 1811 with an MD. His professional life was spent as a practising physician in London, but he also occupied himself with chemical research.  He was an active worker in biological chemistry and carried out many analyses of the secretions of living organisms, which he believed were produced by the breakdown of bodily tissues.  In 1823, he discovered that stomach juices contain hydrochloric acid, which can be separated from gastric juice by distillation.  In 1827, he proposed the classification of substances in food into sugars and starches, oily bodies, and albumen, which would later become known as carbohydrates, fats, and proteins.

Prout is better remembered, however, for his researches into physical chemistry.  In 1815, based on the tables of atomic weights available at the time, he anonymously hypothesized that the atomic weight of every element is an integer multiple of that of hydrogen, suggesting that the hydrogen atom is the only truly fundamental particle (which he called protyle), and that the atoms of the other elements are made of groupings of various numbers of hydrogen atoms.  While Prout's hypothesis was not borne out by later more-accurate measurements of atomic weights, it was a sufficiently fundamental insight into the structure of the atom that in 1920, Ernest Rutherford chose the name of the newly discovered proton to, among other reasons, give credit to Prout.

Prout contributed to the improvement of the barometer, and the Royal Society of London adopted his design as a national standard.

He was elected a Fellow of the Royal Society in 1819. He delivered the Goulstonian Lecture to the Royal College of Physicians in 1831 on the application of chemistry to medicine.

Prout wrote the eighth Bridgewater Treatise, Chemistry, Meteorology, and the Function of Digestion, considered with reference to Natural Theology.  It was in this work that he coined the term "convection" to describe a type of energy transfer.

In 1814, Prout married Agnes Adam, daughter of Alexander Adam, of Edinburgh, Scotland, and together they had six children. Prout died in London in 1850 and was buried in Kensal Green Cemetery.

The "Prout" is a unit of nuclear binding energy, and is 1/12 the binding energy of the deuteron, or 185.5 keV.  It is named after William Prout.  "Proutons" was an early candidate for the name of what are now called protons.

Honours and awards
 Fellow of the Royal Society (1819)
 Copley Medal (1827)
 Fellow of the Royal College of Physicians (1829)

Bibliography

 
 
 
 Prout, William (1834).  Chemistry, Meteorology, and the Function of Digestion Considered with Reference to Natural Theology; Bridgewater Treatises, W. Pickering (reissued by Cambridge University Press, 2009)

See also
 Earl of Bridgewater (for other Bridgewater Treatises)
 Atomic number

Notes

References

Further reading 
 
 
 
 
 
 
 
 
 
 The Semiempirical Formula for Atomic Masses

1785 births
1850 deaths
Alumni of the University of Edinburgh
People from South Gloucestershire District
English physical chemists
19th-century English medical doctors
Fellows of the Royal Society
Fellows of the Royal College of Physicians
Recipients of the Copley Medal
18th-century English people
Authors of the Bridgewater Treatises